Deogiri College, Aurangabad, is an undergraduate and postgraduate, coeducational college along with Research center in many disciplines,  situated in Aurangabad, Maharashtra. It was established in the year 1960 by Marathwada Shikshan Prasarak Mandal The college is affiliated with Dr. Babasaheb Ambedkar Marathwada University.

The Post-Graduation courses were introduced in 1999, around 36 PG courses are run under this program. Currently Deogiri college has engineering and management science departments as DIEMS has Director Dr. Ulhas Shiurkar   as well as Biotech department. It was reaccredited 'A' with CGPA 3.75 (III Cycle) by NAAC in 2017.

Departments

Science
Physics
Mathematics
Chemistry
Geology
Electronics
Botany
Microbiology
Biotechnology
Zoology
Computer Science
Environmental Science

Arts and Commerce
Marathi
English
Hindi
Sanskrit
History
Political Science
Home Science
Public Administration
Psychology
Economics
Sociology
Drama
Music
Commerce
Accounts

Accreditation
The college is  recognized by the University Grants Commission (UGC).

Notable aluminises 

 Mayuri Kango – former actress and Google India industrial head, she worked in Bollywood films in late 1990s to early 2000s.

References

External links
http://deogiricollege.org/
https://www.dietms.org/

Dr. Babasaheb Ambedkar Marathwada University
Universities and colleges in Maharashtra
Educational institutions established in 1960
1960 establishments in Maharashtra